The Kupe natural gas field is located in the Tasman Sea, 30 km off the coast of the town of Manaia in Taranaki, New Zealand. The field was discovered in 1986 and is located in 35 metres of water. The production facility comprises an unmanned offshore platform, a 30 km single three phase pipeline to shore and an onshore production station.

Development project
Project development was led by Technip and the total project cost NZ$1.3b. The first export gas was produced in December 2009.  The project was officially opened by Prime Minister John Key on 18 March 2010.

Production facility
The facility is owned by a joint venture comprising;
 Beach Energy (South Australia) (50%),
 Genesis Energy (46%), 
 New Zealand Oil and Gas (4%).

At its peak, the gas produced from the Kupe field is expected to meet 10 to 15 per cent of New Zealand's annual gas demand and 50 per cent of New Zealand's LPG demand.

The facility is maintained and operated by Origin.

See also 
 Energy in New Zealand
 Oil and gas industry in New Zealand

References

External links 
 Origin Energy - Exploration and Production

South Taranaki District
Natural gas fields in New Zealand